Sadagopan (better known as Chitralaya Gopu) is an Indian screenwriter and director who works in the Tamil cinema. He has written nearly 60 films, and directed 27 of them. He scripted dramatic films such as Moondru Dheivangal and Shanti Nilayam and comedies such as Kadhalikka Neramillai, Galatta Kalyanam, Patti Sollai Thattathe and Uttharavindri Ulle Vaa.

Career 
C. V. Sridhar and Sadagopan were childhood friends since their schooldays in St. Joseph's High School, Chengalpattu. Both were playwrights; Sridhar wrote stage plays and played the hero while Sadagopan wrote the humorous parts and played the comedian. Later, when Sridhar had the opportunity to direct a film, he asked Sadagopan to join him and produce the comedy track. The film Kalyana Parisu (1959) was a hit and Sridhar started his own production house, Chitralaya. Sadagopan became popularly known as 'Chitralaya' Gopu.

He received the Kalaimamani Award from Chief Minister, Jayalalithaa in 1992.

He directed and acted in television forays, such as Washingtonil Thirumanam, which was shot in the U.S.

Personal life 
Gopu is married to Kamala, a novelist. They have four sons.

Partial filmography

References

External links 
 

Tamil film directors
Tamil screenwriters
Place of birth missing (living people)
20th-century Indian film directors
1931 births
Living people
People from Kanchipuram district
Screenwriters from Tamil Nadu
Film directors from Tamil Nadu
20th-century Indian dramatists and playwrights